State Route 273 (SR 273) is a  west-east state highway located in the southwestern part of the U.S. state of Georgia. It travels within Early and Miller counties.

Route description
SR 273 begins at an intersection with SR 273 Spur and SR 370 southwest of Cedar Springs. The highway heads northeast to Cedar Springs and then heads east to an intersection with SR 39 just before entering Miller County. It then heads east-southeast to meet its eastern terminus, an intersection with SR 91 southwest of Colquitt. Here, the roadway continues as Cypress Creek Road.

There is no section of SR 273 that is included as a part of the National Highway System, a system of routes determined to be the most important for the nation's economy, mobility and defense.

History
SR 273 was established in 1950 along an alignment from US 84/SR 38 in Jakin, Georgia northeast to SR 39 near the unincorporated community of Killarney. By 1969, SR 273 was moved to the same alignment as it travels today.

Major intersections

Early County spur route

State Route 273 Spur (SR 273 Spur) is a  spur route that exists entirely within the west-central part of Early County.

The spur route begins just east of the Chattahoochee River, at an entrance to a Georgia-Pacific plant. The highway travels on a nearly due east routing until it meets its eastern terminus, an intersection with the SR 273 mainline and SR 370 southwest of Cedar Springs.

There is no section of SR 273 Spur that is included as a part of the National Highway System, a system of routes determined to be the most important for the nation's economy, mobility and defense.

The roadway that would eventually become SR 273 Spur was built between June 1963 and the end of 1966 as an unnumbered road west-southwest from Cedar Springs. In 1967, SR 363 Spur was designated on this road. In 1985, when SR 363 and SR 363 Spur were decommissioned, SR 273 was extended west-southwest of Cedar Springs. This replaced the eastern part of SR 363 Spur. What was the western part was redesignated as SR 273 Spur.

See also

References

External links

273
Transportation in Early County, Georgia
Transportation in Miller County, Georgia